Carnival is the fourth studio album from Australian singer/songwriter Kasey Chambers, released in Australia on 19 August 2006 and in the United States on 12 September 2006 (see 2006 in music).

History
Carnival marks a departure from the trademark styles of Chambers' previous albums, showcasing a more mature and edgier sound. The album features guest appearances by Tim Rogers and Bernard Fanning, as well as appearances by her son, Talon, and nephew, Eden.

On the album, Chambers has said:

On 28 August 2006 the album made its debut on the Australian Albums chart at number one and accrediting Platinum by ARIA. It was knocked off the top spot on its second week in the chart by Bob Dylan's album Modern Times and then on the third week it feel to number three. The album then dropped five places down the chart to number eight and then fell out of the top ten to number fourteen. It spent another two weeks in the top twenty then falling to number twenty-two, then to twenty-eight and after two weeks it fell out of the charts at number forty-two spending eleven weeks in the top fifty.

The album was deemed ineligible for both the Australian and U.S. Billboard country charts, the first of Kasey's albums to not be classified as country. Had it been eligible, based on its sales the album would have charted in the 30s on the Billboard country chart, a similar position to her previous album Wayward Angel.

Two songs were released from the album; "Nothing at All" and "Surrender", both written by Chambers. "Nothing at All" was released as a CD single on 22 July 2006 and had high success debuting and peaking in the Australian Singles Chart top ten at number nine. "Surrender" however was not as successful only peaking at number seventy-four in Australia.

Reception

Music critic Mark Deming, in his Allmusic wrote "While Carnival is roots-friendly enough that it isn't likely to seriously alienate most of her fans, this album does represent a clear and decisive break from the country-influenced approach of her earlier music... As a vocalist, Chambers remains wonderfully expressive while maintaining a realistic emotional palate at all times, and her instrument is simple but gorgeous... With Carnival, Kasey Chambers gives up her title as the greatest Aussie country singer alive and becomes – the greatest Aussie singer around today? Maybe that's going a bit far to make a point, but after hearing this album, most people would be much less likely to argue the point."

Track listing

Personnel 
 Mick Albeck – Violin
 Michael Barker – Percussion, Drums
 Kasey Chambers – Harmony Vocals
 Nash Chambers – Producer, Engineer, Mixing
 Pete Dyball – Assistant
 Bernard Fanning – Harmonica, Vocals
 Jeff McCormack – Bass, Engineer, Mixing
 Jim Moginie – Piano, Guitar (Electric), Keyboards, Mandola
 Mark Punch – Guitar (Electric), Guitar (Resonator), Guitar (Baritone)
 Tim Rogers – Vocals
 Steve Smart – Mastering
 Daniel Smith – Photography
 Michael Spiccia – Art Direction, Design
 Adrian Wallis – Cello

Charts

Weekly charts

Year-end charts

Certifications

References

2006 albums
Kasey Chambers albums
EMI Records albums
Warner Records albums